Chris "The African Warrior" Ngimbi (born 18 April 1984 in Kinshasa) is a Congolese-Dutch Muay Thai kickboxer fighting out of the Siam Gym in Valkenswaard, Netherlands for Black Label.  He is the two times It's Showtime 70MAX world champion fighting primarily within the It's Showtime and the K-1 Global Holding organizations. He also held the SUPERKOMBAT Middleweight Championship in 2016.

Biography and career

Ngimbi was born in Kinshasa the capital city of the Democratic Republic of the Congo.  He was born with a weak heart which doctors felt would make it hard for him to survive his first year.  He spent his childhood in the African country but his family was forced to leave when he was 11 years old due to the civil war and the fact that his father had served in the political party of the recently ousted president Mobutu Sese Seko.  Ngimbi relocated to the Netherlands and was a keen footballer in his teenage years and tipped to do well but decided to focus on kickboxing after making his amateur debut at 18 in Eindhoven representing the Duran Gym.  He would later switch to the Calmaro gym in Helmond after his second B-Klass match with a fighting record of 12 wins and 1 loss. -

After fighting on the local scene for several years, Ngimbi was invited as a member of a Dutch team that would participate in a W.K.A. event in New York City.  Due to an impressive knockout of his opponent he would be invited back to the states the following year to contest against Atlanta based Thai Khunpon Dechkampu for the W.K.A. intercontinental title, in what would be the first of a number of title fights on American soil.  Ngimbi was successful on his return visit to the United States, winning the belt via KO and as winner of the intercontinental belt Ngimbi would get a shot at the W.K.A. world title in 2007, losing to Shane Campbell in their first match in Richmond, only to win the rematch six months later to claim his first world title.

In between trips across the Atlantic Ngimbi would have a number of fights in the Netherlands, defeating useful fighters such as Ray Staring, Kit Sitpholek and William Diender – the latter in the K-1 MAX Netherlands 2008 tournament in which he made the semi finals only to lose to eventual winner Warren Stevelmans (who he had beaten back in 2006).  He also made his debut with the It's Showtime organization defeating English fighter Rick Barnhill in Alkmaar.  In February 2009 Ngimbi had another attempt to qualify for the K-1 MAX via a regional event in Utrecht but lost at the quarter final stage to Marco Piqué. This decision was modified after protest from Ngimbi's corner. In May 2009 after the fight against Schneidmiller in the Amsterdam Arena he left the Calmaro gym to join Siam Gym in Valkenswaard. The switch had led to victories against fighters as Chahid Oulad el Hadj and Hafid el Boustati.

In 2010,  Ngimbi's record with the It's Showtime organization (4 wins, 2 losses) led to the organization inviting him to challenge two time It's Showtime champion Murat Direkçi for his world title belt in Athens at the end of the year.  As the underdog, few expected the African Warrior to triumph but he pulled off a fifth round upset decision win against Direkçi to become the new It's Showtime 70MAX world champion.  Ngimbi retained his It's Showtime 70MAX world title at the It's Showtime 2011 Lyon event, outclassing local fighter Willy Borrel on way to a trademark flying knee KO victory.

In December 2011, Ngimbi shocked the kickboxing world when he stated that he will make one more defence of his belt, against Andy Souwer in June 2012, and then retire. He lost the fight, but came back to his decision to retire so he can participate on the K-1 World Max.

He was stopped by Artur Kyshenko in round two at the quarter-finals of the K-1 World MAX 2012 World Championship Tournament Final in Athens, Greece on December 15, 2012.

Titles and accomplishments
SUPERKOMBAT Fighting Championship
2016 SUPERKOMBAT Middleweight Champion -72.5 kg.

W5 Professional Kickboxing
2015 W5 XXXI Tournament Runner Up -71 kg 
2015 W5 XXX Tournament Champion -71 kg 

It's Showtime
2011 It's Showtime 70MAX world champion -70 kg (2nd title defence)
2010 It's Showtime 70MAX world champion -70 kg

World Kickboxing Association
2007 W.K.A. Muay Thai super welterweight world champion -70 kg
2005 W.K.A. Muay Thai super welterweight intercontinental champion -70 kg 

World Full Contact Association
2003 World Full Contact Association (W.F.C.A.) European champion

Awards
Combat Press
 2015 Knockout of the Year (vs. Ilia Usachev)

Kickboxing record

|-  bgcolor="#CCFFCC"  
| 2018-07-27 || Win ||align=left| Armen Petrosyan || ONE Championship: Reign of Kings || Philippines || Decision (Split) || 3 || 3:00||32-21
|-
|-  bgcolor="FFBBBB" 
| 2018-05-18|| Loss||align=left|  Yodsanklai Fairtex   || ONE Championship: Unstoppable Dreams || Singapore || Decision (Unanimous) || 3 || 3:00|| 31-21
|-  bgcolor="FFBBBB" 
| 2017-10-14 || Loss||align=left| Giorgio Petrosyan || PetrosyanMania || Monza, Italy || Decision (unanimous) || 5 || 3:00 || 31-20
|-
! style=background:white colspan=9 |
|-
|-  bgcolor="FFBBBB" 
| 2016-11-12|| Loss ||align=left| Amansio Paraschiv  || SUPERKOMBAT World Grand Prix 2016 Final || Bucharest, Romania || Decision (unanimous) || 3 || 3:00 || 31-20
|-
! style=background:white colspan=9 |
|-
|-  bgcolor="#CCFFCC"  
| 2016-10-01 || Win ||align=left| Amansio Paraschiv  || SUPERKOMBAT World Grand Prix 2016 Final Elimination || Iași, Romania || Decision (unanimous) || 3 || 3:00 || 31-19
|-
! style=background:white colspan=9 |
|-
|-  bgcolor="FFBBBB"
| 2016-03-25 || Loss ||align=left| Lee Sung-hyun || Kunlun Fight 40, Final || Tongling, China || Decision || 3 ||3:00 || 30-19 
|-
|-  bgcolor="#CCFFCC"
| 2016-03-25 || Win ||align=left| Sergey Kulyaba || Kunlun Fight 40, Semi Finals || Tongling, China || KO || 3 || 2:59 || 30-18
|-
|-  bgcolor="FFBBBB"
| 2015-12-05 || Loss ||align=left| Artem Pashporin || W5 Grand Prix Vienna XXXI, Final || Vienna, Austria || Decision (unanimous) || 3 || 3:00 || 29-18
|-
! style=background:white colspan=9 |
|-
|-  bgcolor="CCFFCC"
| 2015-12-05 || Win ||align=left| Evgeniy Kurovsky || W5 Grand Prix Vienna XXXI, Semi Finals || Vienna, Austria || Decision (unanimous) || 3 || 3:00 || 29-17
|-
|-  bgcolor="#CCFFCC"
| 2015-08-30 ||Win ||align=left| Ilya Usachev || W5 Grand Prix Moscow XXX || Moscow, Russia || KO (Right knee) || 2 || 2:31 || 28-17
|-
! style=background:white colspan=9 |
|-
|-  bgcolor="#CCFFCC"
| 2015-08-30 ||Win ||align=left| Valentin Ribalko || W5 Grand Prix Moscow XXX || Moscow, Russia || TKO (Referee stoppage) || 1 || 3:00 || 27-17
|-
|-  bgcolor="#FFBBBB"
| 2015-04-24 || Loss ||align=left| Enriko Gogokhia || W5 Grand Prix - Kitek || Moscow, Russia || Decision || 3 || 3:00 || 26-17
|-
|-  bgcolor="#FFBBBB"
| 2015-02-28 || Loss ||align=left| Adem Bozkurt || Akın Dövüş Arenası  || İstanbul, Turkey ||Decision  || 3 || 3:00 || 26-16
|-
|-  bgcolor="#CCFFCC"
| 2014-10-04 ||Win ||align=left| Mourad Ouchen || Mix Fight Gala XVI  ||  ||Decision (Unanimous) || 3|| 3:00 ||26-15
|-
|-  bgcolor="#FFBBBB"
| 2014-07-27 || Loss ||align=left| Jiao Fukai || Kunlun Fight 7 - World MAX 2014 Final 8 || Zhoukou, China || Decision || 3 || 3:00 || 25-15
|-
|-  bgcolor="#FFBBBB"
| 2013-11-15 || Loss ||align=left| Mirko Vorkapić || FFC09: McSweeney vs. Traunmuller || Ljubljana, Slovenia || Decision (unanimous) || 3 || 3:00 || 25-14
|-
|-  bgcolor="#FFBBBB"
| 2012-12-15 || Loss ||align=left| Artur Kyshenko || K-1 World MAX 2012 World Championship Tournament Final, Quarter Finals || Athens, Greece || TKO (referee stoppage) || 2 || 1:48 || 25-13
|-
|-  bgcolor="#FFBBBB"
| 2012-06-30 || Loss ||align=left| Andy Souwer || Music Hall & BFN Group present: It's Showtime 57 & 58 || Brussels, Belgium || Decision || 5 || 3:00 || 25-12
|-
! style=background:white colspan=9 |
|-
|-  bgcolor="CCFFCC"
| 2012-05-27 || Win ||align=left| Longern Superpro Samui || K-1 World MAX 2012 World Championship Tournament Final 16 || Madrid, Spain || Decision (Unanimous) || 3 || 3:00 || 25-11 
|-
|-  bgcolor="#FFBBBB"
| 2012-03-24 || Loss ||align=left| Gregory Choplin || Thaiboxing Showtime 3 || Hazebrouck, France || Decision (Unanimous) || 3 || 3:00 || 24-11
|- 
|-  bgcolor="#FFBBBB"
| 2012-01-28 || Loss ||align=left| Harut Grigorian || It's Showtime 2012 in Leeuwarden || Leeuwarden, Netherlands || TKO (Cut) || 2 || 1:22 || 24-10
|-
|-  bgcolor="#FFBBBB"
| 2011-09-24 || Loss ||align=left| Robin van Roosmalen || It's Showtime "Fast & Furious 70MAX", Semi Finals || Brussels, Belgium || Decision (Split) || 3 || 3:00 || 24-9
|-
|-  bgcolor="CCFFCC"
| 2011-09-24 || Win ||align=left| Murat Direkçi ||  It's Showtime "Fast & Furious 70MAX", Quarter Finals || Brussels, Belgium || Decision (Unanimous) || 3 || 3:00 || 24-8 
|-
|-  bgcolor="#CCFFCC"
| 2011-05-14 || Win ||align=left| Willy Borrel || It's Showtime 2011 Lyon || Lyon, France || KO (Left Flying Knee) || 2 || 2:58 || 23-8
|-
! style=background:white colspan=9 |
|-
|-  bgcolor="#CCFFCC"
| 2010-12-11 || Win ||align=left| Murat Direkçi || It's Showtime 2010 Athens || Athens, Greece || Decision (5-0) || 5 || 3:00 || 22-8
|-
! style=background:white colspan=9 |
|-
|-  bgcolor="#CCFFCC"
| 2010-05-29 || Win  ||align=left| Anthony Nekrui || It's Showtime 2010 Amsterdam || Amsterdam, Netherlands || TKO (Ref stop/flying knee) || 3 || 1:33 || 21-8
|-
|-  bgcolor="#CCFFCC"
| 2010-02-27 || Win  ||align=left| Hafid el Boustati || Amsterdam Fight Club || Amsterdam, Netherlands || Ext.R Decision (Unanimous) || 4 || 3:00 || 20-8
|-
|-  bgcolor="#CCFFCC"
| 2009-11-21 || Win  ||align=left| Chahid Oulad El Hadj || It's Showtime 2009 Barneveld || Barneveld, Netherlands || Decision (Unanimous) || 3 || 3:00 || 19-8
|-
|-  bgcolor="#FFBBBB"
| 2009-10-24 || Loss ||align=left| Harut Grigorian || It's Showtime 2009 Lommel || Lommel, Belgium || Ext.R Decision || 4 || 3:00 || 18-8
|-
|-  bgcolor="#CCFFCC"
| 2009-05-16 || Win ||align=left| Dennis Schneidmiller || It's Showtime 2009 Amsterdam || Amsterdam, Netherlands || Decision (Unanimous) || 3 || 3:00 || 18-7
|-
|-  bgcolor="#CCFFCC"
| 2009-03-01 || Win ||align=left| Marco Piqué || K-1 World MAX 2009 Europe, Quarter Finals || Utrecht, Netherlands || Ext.R Decision || 4 || 3:00 || 17-7
|-
|-  bgcolor="#FFBBBB"
| 2008-11-29 || Loss  ||align=left| Joerie Mes || It's Showtime 2008 Eindhoven || Eindhoven, Netherlands || KO (Left Hook) || 2 || 2:08 || 16-7
|-
|-  bgcolor="#CCFFCC"
| 2008-10-05 || Win  ||align=left| Chad Bischop || Ahoy Rotterdam || Rotterdam, Netherlands || Decision (Unanimous)|| 3 || 3:00 || 16-6
|-
|-  bgcolor="#CCFFCC"
| 2008-09-06 || Win ||align=left| Rick Barnhill || It's Showtime 2008 Alkmaar || Alkmaar, Netherlands || TKO (Doc Stop) || 2 || || 15-6
|-
|-  bgcolor="#FFBBBB"
| 2008-04-26 || Loss  ||align=left| Giorgio Petrosyan || K-1 World GP 2008 Amsterdam, Super Fight || Amsterdam, Netherlands || Decision (Unanimous) || 3 || 3:00 || 14-6
|-
|-  bgcolor="#FFBBBB"
| 2008-02-17 || Loss  ||align=left| Warren Stevelmans || K-1 MAX Netherlands 2008, Semi Finals || Utrecht, Netherlands || TKO (Low Kicks) || 2 || 1:48 || 14-5
|-
|-  bgcolor="#CCFFCC"
| 2008-02-17 || Win  ||align=left| William Diender || K-1 MAX Netherlands 2008, Quarter Finals || Utrecht, Netherlands || Decision (Split) || 3 || 3:00 || 14-4
|-
|-  bgcolor="#CCFFCC"
| 2007-11-24 || Win  ||align=left| Kamal Chabrani || Rings "Prepare for Glory" || Hilversum, Netherlands || KO (Left Knee) || 1 || 0:36 || 13-4
|-
|-  bgcolor="#CCFFCC"
| 2007-09-27 || Win ||align=left| Shane Campbell || Combat Sports Challenge 22 "The Reckoning" || Richmond, VA, USA || Decision (Unanimous) || 5 || 3:00 || 12-4
|-
! style=background:white colspan=9 |
|-
|-  bgcolor="#CCFFCC"
| 2007-06-02 || Win ||align=left| Ray Staring || Gentleman Fight Night 2007 || Tilburg, Netherlands || Decision (Unanimous) || 5 || 3:00 || 11-4
|-
|-  bgcolor="#CCFFCC" 
| 2007-05-13 || Win ||align=left| Kit Sitpholek || Fight Night Veghel || Veghel, Netherlands || Decision (Unanimous) || 5 || 3:00 || 10-4
|-
|-  bgcolor="#FFBBBB"
| 2007-03-24 || Loss ||align=left| Shane Campbell || Combat Sports Challenge 19 || Richmond, VA, USA || Decision (Majority) || 5 || 3:00 || 9-4
|-
! style=background:white colspan=9 |
|-
|-|-  bgcolor="#CCFFCC" 
| 2006-12-03 || Win ||align=left| Otmar Diagne ||2H2H || Maastricht, Netherlands || Decision (Unanimous) || 5 || 3:00 || 9-3
|-
|-  bgcolor="#FFBBBB"
| 2006-09-24 || Loss ||align=left| James France || Master Sken's Combat Super Fights || Manchester, England, UK || Decision (Unanimous) || 5 || 3:00 || 8-3
|-
|-  bgcolor="#FFBBBB"
| 2006-06-04 || Loss ||align=left| Winston Martens || Kickbox Gala Druten, Quarter Finals || Druten, Netherlands || Decision (Unanimous) || 3 || 3:00 || 8-2
|-
|-  bgcolor="#CCFFCC"
| 2006-04-15 || Win ||align=left| Warren Stevelmans || Al-Fid Thaibox Gala|| Eindhoven, Netherlands || Decision (Unanimous)|| 3 || 3:00 || 8-1
|-
|-  bgcolor="#CCFFCC"
| 2006-01-28 || Win ||align=left| Jimmy Eimers || Face to Face III, Sporthal de Mheenpark || Apeldoorn, Netherlands || Decision (Unanimous)|| 5 || 3:00 || 7-1
|-
|- bgcolor="#CCFFCC"
| 2005-12-03 || Win ||align=left| Mohamed Rahhoui ||Friends Gym Promotion || Brussels, Belgium || Decision (Majority) || 5 || 3:00 || 6-1
|-
|-  bgcolor="#CCFFCC"
| 2005-09-16 || Win ||align=left| Khunpon Dechkampu || Pride and Glory || Duluth, GA, USA || TKO || 3 || || 5-1
|-
! style=background:white colspan=9 |
|-
|-  bgcolor="#CCFFCC"
| 2005-05-15 || Win  ||align=left| Khalid Raiss ||  WFCA Gala in Druten || Druten, Netherlands || Decision (Unanimous)|| 5 || 2:00 || 4-1
|-
|-style=background:white colspan=9 |
|-
|-  bgcolor="#CCFFCC"
| 2005-05-08 || Win  ||align=left| Murat Delialioglu || Gala Helmond Calmaro Gym WFCA || Helmond, Netherlands || Decision (Unanimous)|| 5 || 2:00 || 3-1
|-
|-  bgcolor="#FFBBBB"
| 2004-09-10 || Loss ||align=left| RaKarma Young || Mayhem on Mulberry Street 3, St. Patrick's Youth Center || New York, NY, USA || Decision (Majority) || 5 || 3:00 || 2-1
|-
|-  bgcolor="#CCFFCC"
| 2004-05-14 || Win ||align=left| Emyr Dakin || Mayhem on Mulberry Street 2, St. Patrick's Youth Center || New York, NY, USA || KO (High Kick) || 1 || 0:58 || 2-0
|-
|-  bgcolor="#CCFFCC"
| 2004-05-08 || Win ||align=left| Abdussamed Delialioglu || Gala Helmond Calmaro Gym || Helmond, Netherlands || Decision (Unanimous) || 5 || 2:00 || 1-0
|-
|-
|-
| colspan=9 | Legend:

See also 
List of It's Showtime events
List of It's Showtime champions
List of K-1 events
List of male kickboxers

References

External links
Chris Ngimbi | Facebook (Dutch Language)

1984 births
Living people
Democratic Republic of the Congo male kickboxers
Dutch male kickboxers
Welterweight kickboxers
Middleweight kickboxers
Democratic Republic of the Congo male karateka
Democratic Republic of the Congo Muay Thai practitioners
Dutch male karateka
Dutch Muay Thai practitioners
Sportspeople from Kinshasa
Democratic Republic of the Congo emigrants to the Netherlands
Kunlun Fight kickboxers
SUPERKOMBAT kickboxers
ONE Championship kickboxers